The 1999 season was the New York Giants' 75th in the National Football League (NFL) and their third under head coach Jim Fassel. The team failed to improve on their 8–8 record from the previous season, winning only seven games and missing the playoffs for the second consecutive season. This was the last season that the team had the script "GIANTS" on the helmet, being replaced with the NY logo for the 2000 season.

Offseason

NFL Draft

Roster

Regular season

Schedule

Standings

Season summary

Week 10 vs Colts

Two Marvin Harrison touchdowns and a Terrence Wilkins punt return score highlighted a 27–19 Colts win. Former Colt Cary Blanchard booted two field goals.

References

New York Giants seasons
New York Giants
New York Giants season
20th century in East Rutherford, New Jersey
Meadowlands Sports Complex